Ganivada is an old village in Lakkavarapu Kota Mandal of Vizianagaram district. Originiting c. 1860, the village is known for its vast mango orchards.

Demographics
Its Population Composition is as follows:

Households: 587;
Total Population: 2,569;
Male Population: 1,289;
Female Population: 1,280;
Children Under 6 Yrs: 303;
Boys Under 6 Yrs: 145;
Girls Under 6 Yrs: 158;
Total Literates: 1,328;
Total Illiterates: 1,241.

See also
 List of Hindu festivals

References

External links 
 Wikimapi.org

Villages in Vizianagaram district
Hindu festivals